The lakes of the White Cloud Mountains are located within the Sawtooth National Recreation Area of Custer County, Idaho.  There are hundreds of lakes in the mountains, and most of the lakes were created by alpine glaciers.  Many of the lakes are small and unnamed.

Lake chains of the White Cloud Mountains

Lakes of the White Cloud Mountains

References

See also

 Sawtooth National Forest
 Sawtooth National Recreation Area
 

Glacial lakes of the United States
Lakes of Idaho
White Cloud Mountains
Salmon-Challis National Forest
Sawtooth National Forest